Giovanni Ludovico della Rovere (died 1510) was a Roman Catholic prelate who served as Bishop of Turin (1503–1510).

Biography
On 8 November 1497, Giovanni Ludovico della Rovere was appointed during the papacy of Pope Alexander VI as Coadjutor Bishop of Turin.
In 1503, he succeeded to the bishopric.
He served as Bishop of Turin until his death in August 1510.

References

External links and additional sources
 (for Chronology of Bishops) 
 (for Chronology of Bishops) 

16th-century Italian Roman Catholic bishops
Bishops appointed by Pope Alexander VI
1510 deaths
Della Rovere family